Rox (often mistitled as Supernova, Rocks or Supernova (Rocks)) is the second album by the pop punk band Supernova, released in 1998.

Critical reception
The Boston Phoenix contrasted the album with Supernova's debut, writing that it "isn't quite as catchy, veering into somewhat less interesting (and even more tangentially alien) territories like phone sex, uh, barn sex, girls, and revved-up early-'80s hardcore." The Los Angeles Times called the album "frequently delightful," and praised the band's "ability to rock out with catchy, crunchy, crisply executed bubble-gum punk."

Track listing
All lyrics written by Supernova.

"Purple Pony" - 2:17
"Back in the Saddle" - 3:11
"Swat the Fly" - 2:36
"Telephone" - 4:04
"Cynot Girl" - 2:44
"Roll in the Hay" - 2:46
"Dancin' Skool" - 3:03
"King Ding Dong" - :11
"3,2,1 Go!" - 2:12
"Mommy" - 3:25
"Flagpole" - 2:16
"Books" - 2:57
"Monsta" - 1:39
"Cowboy" - 2:46
"Rock 'n' Roll" - 4:38

Personnel
Art Mitchell - Vocals, bass guitar
Jodey Lawrence - Guitar, vocals
Dave Collins - Drums, vocals

References

Supernova (American band) albums
1998 albums
Amphetamine Reptile Records albums